Lakewood Country Club is a private country club in Dallas, Texas, United States, founded in 1912, and now often referred to simply as Lakewood. It is located at the corner of Gaston and Abrams Avenues in the Lakewood, Dallas, Texas, about five miles east, northeast of downtown Dallas.  Lakewood Country Club hosted the Texas Victory Open, a PGA Tour golf tournament now known as the HP Byron Nelson Championship, in 1944, the only year the tournament was won by renowned professional golfer Byron Nelson, who is now the tournament's namesake.

The golf course at Lakewood was originally designed by Tom Bendelow, then in 1947 was redesigned by Ralph Plummer.  In 1995, Ben Crenshaw and Bill Coore gave the course another facelift.

References

External links 
 Lakewood Country Club Official Site 

Organizations based in Dallas
Golf clubs and courses in Texas
1912 establishments in Texas
Sports in Dallas
Organizations established in 1912